Óscar Quesada Martínez (born 19 January 1978) is a Spanish footballer who plays for Atlético Mancha Real as a central midfielder.

Club career
Born in Úbeda, Andalusia, Quesada made his senior debut with Orcera CF in 1993. He first arrived in the Tercera División in the 1999–2000 season, signing with Úbeda CF.

Quesada continued playing in the fourth tier the following years, representing Atlético Mancha Real, Torredonjimeno CF, CD Manchego and RSD Alcalá. With the latter, he achieved promotion to the Segunda División B at the end of the 2008–09 campaign.

In July 2012, Quesada joined Real Jaén. He helped his local club promote to the Segunda División at the first attempt, contributing three goals in 34 appearances.

On 8 September 2013, at already 35, Quesada appeared in his first-ever match as a professional, starting and scoring the first goal in a 3–1 home win against Girona FC.

References

External links
 
 
 
 

1978 births
Living people
Spanish footballers
Footballers from Andalusia
Association football midfielders
Segunda División players
Segunda División B players
Tercera División players
Divisiones Regionales de Fútbol players
RSD Alcalá players
Real Jaén footballers